This is the discography of English DJ and producer Zomboy.

Discography

Studio albums and extended plays

Singles

Remixes

Other appearances

References

Discographies of British artists
Electronic music discographies